The second cabinet of Iuliu Maniu was the government of Romania from 13 June to 9 October 1930.

Ministers
The ministers of the cabinet were as follows:

President of the Council of Ministers:
Iuliu Maniu (13 June - 9 October 1930)
Minister of the Interior: 
Alexandru Vaida-Voevod (13 June - 9 October 1930)
Minister of Foreign Affairs: 
Gheorghe Mironescu (13 June - 9 October 1930)
Minister of Finance:
Mihai Popovici (13 June - 9 October 1930)
Minister of Justice:
Grigore Iunian (13 June - 9 October 1930)
Minister of Public Instruction and Religious Affairs:
Nicolae Costăchescu (13 June - 9 October 1930)
Minister of War:
Gen. Nicolae Condeescu (13 June - 9 October 1930)
Minister of Agriculture and Property:
Ion Mihalache (13 June - 9 October 1930)
Minister of Industry and Commerce:
Virgil Madgearu (13 June - 9 October 1930)
Minister of Public Works and Communications:
Mihail Manoilescu (13 June - 9 October 1930)
Minister of Labour, Health, and Social Security:
(interim) Pantelimon Halippa (13 June - 9 October 1930)

Minister of State:
Pantelimon Halippa (13 June - 9 October 1930)

References

Cabinets of Romania
Cabinets established in 1930
Cabinets disestablished in 1930
1930 establishments in Romania
1930 disestablishments in Romania